Alide Maria Salvetta (22 March 1941 – 19 March 1991) was an Italian operatic soprano who had an active international career in concerts and operas from the 1960s until her death in 1991.

Life and career
She began performing professionally in the mid-1960s. She sang in concerts at several notable festivals, including the Berlin Klassiktage, the Donaueschingen Festival, the Festival d'Automne in Paris, the Festival dei Due Mondi, and the Holland Festival. Her opera credits included performances at La Fenice, the Maggio Musicale Fiorentino, the Opéra National de Lyon, the Paris Opera, the Teatro Comunale di Bologna, the Teatro dell'Opera di Roma, the Teatro di San Carlo, and the Teatro Regio di Torino. Sne notably created the role of the Cantatrice/Juliana in the world premiere of Salvatore Sciarrino's Aspern at the Teatro della Pergola in Florence in 1978.

Salvetta was particularly known for her work as a concert soprano and recitalist, and she frequently performed in concerts and recitals with the pianist . She also appeared in concerts with many notable orchestras, including the London Sinfonietta, the RAI National Symphony Orchestra, and the Spanish National Orchestra among others.

Salvetta died in Trento in 1991 at the age of 49.

References

1941 births
1991 deaths
Italian operatic sopranos
20th-century Italian women opera  singers